Jonas Schomburg (born 31 January 1994) is a German triathlete. He qualified to represent Germany at the 2020 Summer Olympics in Tokyo 2021, competing in triathlon.

Notable Achievements 
- 5th place at the 2019 Weihai ITU Triathlon World Cup

- 9th place at the 2019 Tokyo ITU World Triathlon Olympic Qualification Event

- 2nd place at the 2019 GER Sprint Triathlon National Championships

- 9th place at the 2019 Madrid ITU Triathlon World Cup

- 1st place at the 2018 Mariental ATU Triathlon African Cup

References

External links
Jonas Schomburg at triathlon.org 

 

1994 births
Living people
German male triathletes
Triathletes at the 2020 Summer Olympics
Olympic triathletes of Germany
Sportspeople from Hanover
20th-century German people
21st-century German people